Donald Bryant may refer to:

Donald "Isa" Hamm Bryant (1943–2007), American author, historian and activist
Don Bryant (songwriter) (born 1942), American singer and songwriter
Don Bryant (baseball) (1941–2015), catcher and coach in Major League Baseball
Donald A. Bryant, American bioscientist and author
Donald L. Bryant Jr. (born 1942), American businessman, art collector, vineyard owner and philanthropist